San Miguel is a town in Corrientes Province, Argentina. It is the head town of the San Miguel Department.

External links

Site web related www.smcorrientes.com.ar

Populated places in Corrientes Province